John Kasaipwalova is an author of Papua New Guinea.  He was born in 1949 of indigenous parentage in Okaikoda Village on Kiriwina Island of the Trobriand Islands, Milne Bay Province of Papua New Guinea.  He was originally destined to be a tribal chief, but he was instead sent to Catholic school where he earned an academic scholarship to attend University of Queensland, to study veterinary medicine.  Before finishing that degree he enrolled at the University of Papua New Guinea, where he began his literary career and gained a reputation as an anti-colonial radical.

After his time at University of Papua New Guinea (UPNG) he moved into various business enterprises and the Boards of public enterprises and bodies including the National Cultural Commission. He also served on the Council of UPNG for 8 years. In local government he was with the Milne Bay Area Authority and the Kiriwina LLG. Since 1995 he is one of the 12 member Kiriwina Council of Chiefs. He is now returning to writing and is a writer in residence at the UPNG Press and Bookshop.

Published works
Hanuabada (a compilation of poetry) (1972)
Reluctant Flame (a compilation of poetry) (1972)
Yaulabuta, Kolupa, deli lekolekwa (pilatolu kilivila wosimwaya) (1978)
Yaulabuta, the passion of Chief Kailaga : an historical poem from the Trobriand Islands (translated into English with Ulli Beier) (1978)
Kanaka's Dream (satirical play)
The Rooster in the Confessional (satirical play)
The Naked Jazz (satirical play)
My Brother (satirical play)
My Enemy (satirical play)
Sail the Midnight Sun (co-author with Greg Murphy) (folk opera) (1980)
Betel Nut is Bad Magic for Airplanes (short story)

Other work
Kasaipwalova also developed the grass-roots co-operative and cultural movement in Trobriand Islands.

References

Papua New Guinean poets
Living people
1949 births
Papua New Guinean dramatists and playwrights
20th-century poets
20th-century dramatists and playwrights
People from Milne Bay Province
University of Papua New Guinea alumni